Bleistein v. Donaldson Lithographing Company, 188 U.S. 239 (1903), is a case in which the United States Supreme Court found that advertisements were protected by copyright. The case is now cited for the proposition that commercial speech can be protected by copyright.

Facts
The named plaintiff was George Bleistein, an employee of the Courier Lithographing Company. The company had been hired by Benjamin Wallace, owner of a traveling circus called the "Great Wallace Show" (which would later become the Hagenbeck-Wallace Circus) to design and produce a number of chromolithographs used to produce posters to promote the circus. The posters featured images from the circus, such as ballet dancers and acrobats. When Wallace ran out of posters, rather than ordering more from the plaintiff, Wallace hired the Donaldson Lithographing Company - a competitor of the plaintiff - to manufacture copies of three of those posters.
Courier (and Bleistein, in name) sued Donaldson for copyright infringement. Donaldson objected on the basis that the posters were merely advertisements, and thus should not be considered eligible for copyright protection either under the Constitution of the United States or under the controlling Copyright Act of 1870. The United States Court of Appeals for the Sixth Circuit held that the posters were not amenable to copyright protection, and Courier appealed.

The Posters 
Holmes described the posters as being "of an ordinary ballet", of "the Stirk family, performing on bicycles", and of "men and women whitened to represent statues".

Opinion of the Court
Justice Oliver Wendell Holmes, Jr., writing for the Court, found that it was irrelevant that the posters were made for advertising. Holmes laid out this ruling in language which has become well-worn in copyright case law:

Dissents
A dissenting opinion was submitted by Justice Harlan, joined by Justice McKenna, agreeing with the Sixth Circuit that advertising posters "would not be promotive of the useful arts within the meaning of the constitutional provision", and were therefore not "fine art" for the Constitution permitted protection.

References

Further reading 
Diane Leenheer Zimmerman, "The Story of Bleistein v. Donaldson Lithographing Company: Originality as a Vehicle for Copyright Inclusivity", in Jane C. Ginsburg and Rochelle Cooper Dreyfuss, Intellectual Property Stories (2005), pp. 77–108.

External links
 

United States copyright case law
1903 in United States case law
United States Supreme Court cases
United States Supreme Court cases of the Fuller Court
Posters